Jack Robert Gage (January 13, 1899 – March 14, 1970) was an American author, educator, and politician who served as the 25th Governor of Wyoming as a member of the Democratic Party.

Early life and education

Jack Robert Gage was born on January 13, 1899, in McCook, Nebraska to Will Vernon and LaVaughn Gage. In 1905, the family moved to Worland, Wyoming where Gage was raised. In 1918, he served in the army during World War I artillery until he was honorably discharged in 1919. In 1924, he received a Bachelor of Arts degree from the University of Wyoming in agriculture. On September 29, 1922, he married Leona Switzer and would later have two sons with her. From 1924 to 1925, he was a vocational agriculture teacher and from 1929 to 1934, he was a geology and biology teacher.

Career

Superintendent of Public Instruction 

On June 29, 1934, Gage filed to run for the Democratic nomination for Superintendent of Public Instruction and defeated five other candidates in the August primary. In the general election, he easily defeated Katharine A. Morton, the Republican nominee, in a landslide. In 1936, he went to Washington, D.C. to meet with Wyoming's congressional delegation seeking to have Wyoming's act of admission changed so that 33% of oil royalties could be distributed directly to school districts. In 1937, he and five other state officials had their voices recorded and Gage also wrote an essay that were placed into a time capsule which would be opened in 1987. On March 16, 1938, he announced that he would seek reelection, but was narrowly defeated in the general election by Republican Esther Anderson.

Business and education 

In 1940, he became a manager for a KWYO radio station in Sheridan, invested into a school supply company, and wrote a Wyoming geography book for fifth to eighth grade students. On May 22, 1941, he was elected to the faculty of the Sheridan High School and on November 5, he assumed the role of Sheridan postmaster which he served as until 1958. In 1954, he was elected as president of the Wyoming chapter of the National Association of Postmasters and served until 1955. In 1956, he was elected as district governor for the Rotary International in Sheridan and was a member of a 37-person delegation that visited East and West Berlin and Moscow. In 1957, he was given a bronze medal at a banquet by the Crusade for Freedom association after writing the book "Plan for Peace" and spoke about his experience in the Soviet Union.

Governor 

On June 6, 1958, Gage filed to run for the Democratic nomination for Secretary of State and in the general election he narrowly defeated Republican nominee Everett Copenhaver by 1,112 votes.

On December 1, 1960, Senator-elect Keith Thomson died causing a vacancy that Governor John J. Hickey chose to fill himself and on December 22, he resigned from office to accept the appointment. According to provisions of the state constitution Gage succeeded Hickey as governor. Before taking office he had to submit forty appointments for state boards and commissions and after taking office had to submit another thirty and with other transition issues to deal with made him unable to attend John F. Kennedy's presidential inauguration. During his tenure as governor he supported measures to increase the amount of money given to the states from federal oil royalties and opposed most tax increases. In March 1962, William M. Jack, the Democratic nominee for governor in 1954, announced that he would mount a primary challenge against Gage and Gage narrowly defeated him by 4,176 votes and went on to be defeated in the general election by Teton county commissioner Clifford Hansen.

Later life and death

Following his defeat he vacationed in Australia for several months from 1963 to 1964 where he traveled over 9,000 miles and later wrote about it for a magazine. In 1966, he announced that he would run in the Democratic primary for governor, but was defeated in the primary and later that year published "Wyoming Afoot and Horseback".

In July 1968, he had his kidney removed and suffered an illness two weeks later. Gage died on March 14, 1970, at his home in Cheyenne after suffering from cancer for several months at age 71.

Electoral history

References

External links
Brief biographical sketch and list of gubernatorial papers at the Wyoming State Archives
Wyoming Statewide Election Guide 2006

1899 births
1970 deaths
20th-century American politicians
Deaths from cancer in Wyoming
Democratic Party governors of Wyoming
People from McCook, Nebraska
People from Worland, Wyoming
Politicians from Cheyenne, Wyoming
Secretaries of State of Wyoming
United States Army soldiers
University of Wyoming alumni
Writers from Wyoming